Michael Rice may refer to:

 Mike Rice (basketball), American basketball television commentator
 Michael Rice (cyclist) (born 1996), competed in the 2018 Tour of California
 Michael Rice (hurler) (born 1984), Kilkenny hurler
 Michael Rice (singer) (born 1997), British entrant for Eurovision Song Contest 2019
 Mike Rice Jr. (born 1969), American basketball coach
 Michael A. Rice (born 1955), American biologist and politician
 Michael W. Rice (born 1943), president and CEO of Utz Quality Foods, Inc.